Tom Kalsås (born 27 February 1986) is a Norwegian jurist and politician for the Labour Party. He has served as a deputy member of the Storting for Rogaland since 2017 and State Secretary at the Ministry of Transport since 2022.

Political career

Local politics 
Kalsås was elected to the Gjesdal municipal council in the 2007 local elections. Following the 2019 elections, he was elected to the Rogaland County Council and became his party's group leader. 

In 2022, he became the Rogaland Labour Party's candidate for county mayor. However in November, he was appointed state secretary in the Støre Cabinet, forcing the county chapter to look for a new candidate.

Parliament 
He was elected deputy representative to the Storting from the constituency of Rogaland for the periods 2017–2021 and 2021–2025, for the Labour  Party. He deputised for Hadia Tajik in the Storting from 2021 to 2022
while Tajik was government minister.

State Secretary 
On 4 November 2022, Kalsås was appointed state secretary at the Ministry of Transport.

In December, following criticism from citizens of Møre og Romsdal regarding cuts in ferry offers, Kalsås asserted that the government would be prioritising ferries going forwards and that 420 million NOK would be spent to reduce ferry prices in 2023.

In January 2023, it was revealed that an elderly woman had been found dead outside Oslo after a taxi had meant to deliver her to Lilleborg Health House. The death was one of many to have occurred since 2014, and Oslo University Hospital has since 2018 asked to transport their severely ill patients, but have always been rejected due to them requiring a taxi permit to do so. Kalsås reiterated this when asked about the case by NRK, saying: "There is a reason to look at where the boundaries should go, should there be more exceptions to the permit requirement".

References

1986 births
Living people
Labour Party (Norway) politicians
Rogaland politicians
Members of the Storting
21st-century Norwegian politicians